South Dakota Department of Transportation Bridge No. 63-198-181 was a historic bridge in rural Turner County, South Dakota, carrying 460th Avenue across the East Fork Vermillion River south of Davis. Built in 1909, it was a well-preserved example of bridges built for the county by the Iowa Bridge Company. It was listed on the National Register of Historic Places in 1999.

Description and history
It was a three-span structure, with timber-framed approach spans on either side of a central Pratt through truss. The truss elements were riveted together, and the bridge's deck support consisted of two layers of wooden planking set on timber beams laid over steel I-beams, which were riveted to hangar plates on the trusses.

The bridge was built in 1909 by the Iowa Bridge Company of Des Moines, Iowa. The county had a contract with that company to provide its steel truss bridges between 1905 and 1911, apparently as part of a common but illegal practice of "pooling", in which companies divided the state into areas where they did not compete against one another. This bridge was a typical example of the company's work.  It was replaced between 2006 and 2008.

See also
National Register of Historic Places listings in Turner County, South Dakota
List of bridges on the National Register of Historic Places in South Dakota

References

National Register of Historic Places in Turner County, South Dakota
Bridges on the National Register of Historic Places in South Dakota
Bridges completed in 1909
Transportation in Turner County, South Dakota